County Bridge No. 54 is a historic stone arch bridge located near Prospectville in Whitemarsh Township, Montgomery County, Pennsylvania. The bridge was built in 1841 and rebuilt in 1916. The bridge crosses a branch of Wissahickon Creek.

It was listed on the National Register of Historic Places in 1988.

References 

Road bridges on the National Register of Historic Places in Pennsylvania
Bridges completed in 1841
Bridges in Montgomery County, Pennsylvania
National Register of Historic Places in Montgomery County, Pennsylvania
Stone arch bridges in the United States